Tallinna Linnatranspordi AS (TLT) is a transportation company owned by the city of Tallinn, Estonia. TLT is a result of the merger of Tallinn Bus Company (Tallinna Autobussikoondis) and Tallinn Tram and Trolleybus Company (Tallinna Trammi- ja Trollibussikoondis) in July 2012. The company provides bus, trolleybus, and tram services in Tallinn.

History

Tallinn Bus Company
TAK was founded in 1945 as a state-owned company, under which status it operated until 1993, when it was reorganised as a public limited company owned by the City of Tallinn. Currently, the company is divided into seven operating divisions.

Tallinn Tram and Trolleybus Company
Tallinn Tram and Trolleybus Company was started in 1997.

Merger
Tallinn Tram and Trolleybus Company was merged with Tallinn Bus Company, and Tallinna Linnatranspordi AS officially started its operations under the new name on 18 July 2012.

At the end of 2019, the company's bus fleet has 529 buses serving 75 bus routes. TLT plans to replace all diesel buses with gas buses by 2025.

Routes

Buses
1 Viru Keskus - Viimsi keskus
2 Mõigu - Balti jaam
3 Veerenni - Randla
4 Väike-Õismäe - Tiskre
5 Männiku - Metsakooli tee
6 Merivälja Pansion - Metsakooli tee
7 Seli - Sõjamäe
8 Viru keskus - Äigrumäe
9 Kadaka - Priisle
10 Väike-Õismäe - Vana Pääsküla
11 Kadaka - Kivisilla
12 Väike Õismäe - Priisle
13 Väike Õismäe - Seli
14 Viru keskus - Vana Pääsküla
15 Viru keskus - Sõjamäe
16 Väike Õismäe - Tallinn-Väike
17 J.Sütiste tee - Bussijaam
17A J.Sütiste tee - Juhkentali
18 Viru keskus - Laagri
18A Viru keskus - Urda
20 Reisisadam (D-terminal) - Pääsküla jaam
20A Viru keskus - Laagri alevik
21 Balti jaam - Landi
21A Väike Õismäe - Kakumäe
21B Balti jaam - Kakumäe
22 Väike Õismäe - Estonia
23 Kadaka - Bussijaam
24 Kadaka - Estonia
26 Väike Õismäe - Paljassaare
26A Väike Õismäe - Paljassaare põik
27 Harkujärve - Laagri alevik
28 Veerenni - Väike Õismäe
29 Viru keskus - Iru hooldekodu - Priisle
30 Seli - Iru - Kärmu
31 Priisle - Estonia
32 Männiku - Kopli
33 Männiku - Kopli
34 Viru keskus - Muuga aedlinn
35 Viru keskus - Seli
36 Väike Õismäe - Viru
37 Mustamäe - Zoo
38 Viru keskus - Muuga
39 Veerenni - Liikuri
40 Viru keskus - Pelguranna
41 Balti jaam - Landi
41B Balti jaam - Kakumäe
42 Väike Õismäe - Kaubamaja
43 Väike Õismäe - Balti jaam
44 Viru keskus - P.Pinna
45 Väike Õismäe - Ülemiste
46 Väike Õismäe - Seli
47 Väike Õismäe - Bussijaam
48 Viru keskus - Pelguranna
49 Viimsi keskus - Lennujaam
50 Seli - Pae
51 Viru keskus - Priisle
54 Kurina - Estonia
55 Hobujaama - P.Pinna
57 Raudalu - Kalev
58 Priisle - Pae
59 Balti jaam - Pikakari
60 Priisle - Maneeži
61 Kotermaa - Järve haigla
62 Väike Õismäe - Mäeküla
63 Priisle - Maneeži
64 Väike-Õismäe - Ülemiste
65 Seli - Lennujaam
66 Priisle - Pelguranna
67 Seli - Estonia
68 Priisle - Estonia
72 Keskuse - Kopli
73 Veerenni - Kopli liinid

Trams

1 Kopli – Kadriorg
2 Kopli – Suur-Paala
3 Tondi – Kadriorg
4 Tondi – Lennujaam

Trolleybuses
1 Mustamäe - Kaubamaja
3 Mustamäe – Kaubamaja
4 Keskuse - Balti jaam
5 Mustamäe - Balti jaam

Former trolleybus routes
2 Mustamäe - Estonia (replaced by regular bus routes 24 and 24A on 1 December 2012)
6 Väike-Õismäe - Kaubamaja (replaced by regular bus route 42 on 1 January 2017)
7 Väike-Õismäe - Balti jaam (replaced by regular bus route 43 on 1 January 2017)
8 Väike-Õismäe - Vabaduse Square (replaced by regular bus route 22 on 1 April 2000)
9 Keskuse – Kopli (replaced by regular bus route 72 on 2 May 2017)

See also 
 Public transport in Tallinn
 Trams in Tallinn
 Transport in Estonia

References

External links
 Official website

Bus operating companies of Europe
Bus transport in Estonia
Transport companies established in 2012
Transport companies of Estonia
Trolleybus transport in Estonia
Companies based in Tallinn
Municipally owned companies
Tallinn
Estonian companies established in 2012